Sodium phenylacetate/sodium benzoate, sold under the brand name Ammonul among others, is a combination medication used to treat high blood ammonia. It is a combination of sodium phenylacetate and sodium benzoate.

References

External links 
 

Combination drugs
Organic sodium salts